Ponnamaravathi block is a revenue block in Pudukkottai district, Tamil Nadu, India. It has a total of 42 panchayat villages.

Villages of Ponnamaravathi block 
1.	Alampatti  
2.	Alavayal  
3.	Ammakuruchi  
4.	Arasamalai  
5.      Anjupulipatti 
6.	Bagavandipatti  
7.	Edayathur  
8.	Enathy  
9.	Gudalur, Pudukkottai  
10.	Kallampatty  
11.	Kandiyanatham  
12.	Karaiyur  
13.	Kattupatty  
14.	Keelathaniyam  
15.	Konnaipatti  
16.	Konnaiyampati  
17.	Koppanapatti  
18.	Kovanoor, Pudukkottai  
19.	M.usilampatti  
20.	Maravamadurai  
21.	Menilai, T.malampatti  
22.	Melasivapuri  
23.	Melathaniyam  
24.	Mullipatti  
25.	Mylapore, Pudukkottai  
26.	Nagarapatti  
27.	Nallur, Pudukkottai  
28.	Nerunjikudi  
29.	Oliyamangalam  
30.	P.usilampatti  
31.	R.palakurichi  
32.	Semboothi  
33.	eranoor  
34.	Sevalur  
35.	Sundaram, Pudukkottai  
36.	Thennur, Pudukkottai  
37.	Thirukalambur  
38.	Thoodur  
39.	Thottiyampatti  
40.	Valakurichi  
41.	Varpet  
42.	Vegupatti  
43.	Vendanpatti

References 

 

Revenue blocks of Pudukkottai district